

The MAI Kvant (also known as the MAI-SKB-3PM) was a Soviet aerobatic trainer designed by students at the Moscow Aviation Institute. In October 1967 the aircraft was displayed at the Economic Achievement Exhibition in Moscow. The Kvant was a single-seat low-wing monoplane with a retractable main landing gear and a fixed tailwheel. It was powered by a  Vedeneyev M14P radial engine. The aircraft held five official FAI world records.

Specifications

References

Notes

Bibliography

 

1960s Soviet military trainer aircraft
Single-engined tractor aircraft
Aerobatic aircraft